Bombay Mittai is a 2015 Kannada-language comedy drama film, written and directed by Chandra Mohan. It stars Vikram, Disha Pandey, Niranjan Deshpande and Chikkanna. The film was produced by Soudha Sherif and Amir Sherif.

Plot 
Three friends, Vishnu, Seenu, and Sundra are travelling from Bangalore to Karwar to celebrate their friend Rocky's birthday party. Aditi, an adventurous girl, also joins the road trip at the request of Vishnu.

During their journey, the friends try unsuccessfully to impress Aditi. When the group reaches Karwar, Aditi, exhausted from the journey, leaves the party to take a nap and Sundra passes out, drunk.

Rocky enters Aditi's room and attempts to rape her. Aditi protects herself by hitting Rocky with a bottle and severely injuring him. When they hear the noise, Vishnu and Seenu rush in and take Rocky to the nearest government hospital.

Sundra sleeps through all of this, unaware that anything took place. Meanwhile, Rocky's assistant, Koty, sees the blood and immediately informs the police. After checking on Rocky at the hospital, Koty learns that he has been placed in the ICU. With this information, Koty and his associates think Rocky is unlikely to survive his injuries, and subsequently form a plan to take advantage of the situation and rob Rocky's home.

The police begin to search for the suspects based on Rocky's complaint. Vishnu blames Aditi for the incident. Seenu stands with Aditi, whilst Sundra is still unaware of what happened. They devise a plan to send Sundra to Rocky; to convince him to withdraw his complaint against the others, who did not take part in the incident. Rocky rejects this request and the police apprehend Sundra, Koty, and his associates.

Failing to gather information from Sundra, the three friends assume he was arrested. Sundra's lawyer advises him not to talk to the police until he has posted bail. As the three others drive back towards Bangalore, they pick up an elderly woman at the side of the road who is looking for her grandchild. Later on, they spot a police checkpoint and immediately turn the vehicle onto a crossroads. The police notice them trying to escape the roadblock and chase after them. After arresting them, the police find out that the elderly woman is the grandmother of a police officer named Inspector Satish. The police release them but have them arrested again (excluding the grandmother), based on information sent by the Karwar police station.

Aditi confides in Inspector Satish. She tells him what happened and asks him to let her meet Rocky. The police agree to let Aditi meet Rocky to work things out. She makes him aware of the errors of his ways, and he realizes that she was acting in self-defence. Rocky finally agrees to withdraw his complaint from the police, and Sundra is released. During the conversation between the inspector and Aditi, she reveals that she loves Seenu because he shows respect towards women.

Cast 

 Vikram as Vishnu 
 Niranjan Deshpande as Seena
 Disha Pandey as Aditi
 Chikkanna as Sundra
 RJ Rohith as Inspector Satish
 Bullet Prakash as Koty
 Kishori Ballal as the grandmother of Satish
 Sunil as Rocky
 Naloor Narayan as Inspector

Production 
The film was shot in various locations in Karnataka, including Chikamagaluru, Madikeri, Mangalore and Mysore.

Soundtrack 

Naveen Kumar wrote the song "Chaliyagtide", which reused the title theme of Aashiqui 2. The song is one minute long and was used for film promotion, however it was not included in the official soundtrack.

Release 
The film was released on 15 May 2015 by Bahar Films.

A Telugu version of the movie was released in 2017 by Bhimavaram Talkies.

Reception 
Sunayana Suresh of The Times of India gave the film a rating of 3.5 stars, writing that "The story is crisp, has a lot of fun moments, and easily works in the 'timepass' movie genre".

References

External links 

2015 films
2010s Kannada-language films
Indian comedy-drama films